Federico Pedini Amati (born 11 August 1976) is a political figure from San Marino.

Captain Regent

He served as Captain Regent of San Marino for the term from 1 April 2008 to October 2008. As joint head of state according to the country's constitution, he served together with Rosa Zafferani.

Political affiliation

Pedini is a member of the Party of Socialists and Democrats.

See also

 Politics of San Marino

References

 Index Pe-Ph. Rulers.org. Accessed 2011-03-03.
 April 2008. Rulers.org. Accessed 2011-03-03.

1976 births
Living people
Captains Regent of San Marino
Members of the Grand and General Council
Party of Socialists and Democrats politicians